Cadherin EGF LAG seven-pass G-type receptor 2 is a protein that in humans is encoded by the CELSR2 gene.

The protein encoded by this gene is a member of the flamingo subfamily, part of the cadherin superfamily. The flamingo subfamily consists of nonclassic-type cadherins; a subpopulation that does not interact with catenins. The flamingo cadherins are located at the plasma membrane and have nine cadherin domains, seven epidermal growth factor-like repeats and two laminin A G-type repeats in their ectodomain. They also have seven transmembrane domains, a characteristic unique to this subfamily. It is postulated that these proteins are receptors involved in contact-mediated communication, with cadherin domains acting as homophilic binding regions and the EGF-like domains involved in cell adhesion and receptor-ligand interactions. The specific function of this particular member has not been determined.

See also
 Flamingo (protein)

References

Further reading

External links
 

Adhesion G protein-coupled receptors
G protein-coupled receptors